The foundation Pro Helvetia is a public foundation of Switzerland.

Presidents
From 1939 to 1943, Heinrich Häberlin.
From 1944 to 1952, Paul Lachenal.
From 1952 to 1964, Jean-Rodolphe de Salis.
From 1965 to 1970, Michael Stettler.
From 1971 to 1977, Willy Spühler.
From 1978 to 1985, Roland Ruffieux.
From 1986 to 1989, Sigmund Widmer.
From 1990 to 1998, Rosemarie Simmen.
From 1998 to 2005, Yvette Jaggi.
From 2006 to 2013, Mario Annoni.
From 2014 to, Charles Beer.

Bibliography
Franz Kessler, "Die Schweizerische Stiftung Pro Helvetia", Schulthess Polygraphischer Verlag, Zürich, 1993, thèse de doctorat de droit.

See also 
 Presence Switzerland

External links
 Official website
 

Foundations based in Switzerland
Cultural promotion organizations
Foreign relations of Switzerland
Government agencies established in 1939
Government agencies of Switzerland